Bartosz Rymaniak (born 13 November 1989) is a Polish professional footballer who plays for Arka Gdynia as a right-back.

References

External links
 
 

Polish footballers
1989 births
Ekstraklasa players
I liga players
III liga players
Kania Gostyń players
Zagłębie Lubin players
MKS Cracovia (football) players
Korona Kielce players
Jarota Jarocin players
Piast Gliwice players
Górnik Łęczna players
Arka Gdynia players
Living people
People from Gostyń
Sportspeople from Greater Poland Voivodeship
Association football defenders
Poland international footballers